Chhatarpur Temple (Officially: Shri Aadya Katyayani Shakti Peetham) is located in a down town area in Chhatarpur, Delhi, India. This temple is dedicated to Goddess, Katyayani. The entire complex of the temple is spread over a wide area of 70 acres. It is located at Chhatarpur, on the southwestern outskirts of the New Delhi and is just  from Qutub Minar, off Mehrauli-Gurgaon road.

The temple was established in 1974, by Baba Sant Nagpal ji, who died in 1998. His samadhi shrine lies in the premises of the Shiv-Gauri Nageshwar Mandir within the temple complex.

This temple was considered as the 2nd biggest temple in India and 3rd largest in the world, before the Akshardham Temple was created in 2005 in Delhi. This temple is totally constructed from marble and on all the facets there is jaali (perforated stone or latticed screen) work. It can be classified a vesara style of architecture.

Surroundings are an important biodiversity area within the Northern Aravalli leopard wildlife corridor stretching from Sariska Tiger Reserve to Delhi. Historical place around sanctuary are Badkhal Lake (6km northeast), 10th century ancient Surajkund reservoir and Anangpur Dam, Damdama Lake, Tughlaqabad Fort and Adilabad ruins (both in Delhi). It is contiguous to the seasonal waterfalls in Pali-Dhuaj-Kot villages of Faridabad, the saсred Mangar Bani and the Asola Bhatti Wildlife Sanctuary. There are several dozen lakes formed in the abandoned open pit mines in the forested hilly area of Delhi Ridge.

The complex

The main deity in the temple is Goddess Katyayani, a part of Navadurga, the nine forms of Hindu goddess Durga or Shakti, worshipped during the Navratri celebrations.

A side shrine within the main temple houses a shrine of Goddess Katyayani (Durga), which opens only during the bi-annual Navratri season, when thousands of people throng the premises for darshan. One nearby room has been made as living room with tables and chairs made in silver, and another regarded as the Shayan Kaksha (Bed Room), where a bed, dressing table and table are carved in silver. This shrine opens on a large satsang or prayer hall, where religious discourses and bhajans, (religious songs) are held. Just at the entrance to the main temple, stand an old tree, where devotees tie holy threads for wish fulfillment. Another shrine of Goddess Durga is open to devotees morning to evening, it lies above the shrines dedicated to Radha Krishna, and Lord Ganesh.

Apart from this the complex also has other temples dedicated to Lord Rama, Lord Ganesha and Lord Shiva. The temples have been built in both South and North Indian style of temple architecture.

References

External links

 Chhatrapur temple complex at wikimapia

See also

Chhattarpur

Chhattarpur (Delhi Metro)

Shakti temples
Hindu temples in Delhi
Mehrauli